The 1992 Dow Classic was a women's tennis tournament played on outdoor grass courts that was part of Tier IV of the 1992 WTA Tour. It was the 11th edition of the event and the last to be named the "Dow Classic" before the tournament sponsor changed to DFS. It took place at the Edgbaston Priory Club in Birmingham, United Kingdom from 8 June until 14 June 1992.

Entrants

Seeds

Other entrants
The following players received wildcards into the main draw:
  Betsy Nagelsen
  Rennae Stubbs
  Clare Wood

The following players received entry from the qualifying draw:
  Elise Burgin
  Valda Lake
  Cammy MacGregor
  Julie Richardson
  Stella Sampras
  Shirli-Ann Siddall
  Heidi Sprung

The following players received a lucky loser spot:
  Camille Benjamin
  Agnese Blumberga

Finals

Singles

 Brenda Schultz defeated  Jenny Byrne 6–2, 6–2
 It was Schultz's first title of the year and the 2nd of her career.

Doubles

 Lori McNeil /  Rennae Stubbs defeated  Sandy Collins /  Elna Reinach 5–7, 6–3, 8–6
 It was McNeil's first doubles title of the year and the 24th of her career. It was Stubbs' third doubles title of the year and the 3rd of her career.

External links
 1992 Dow Classic draws
 ITF tournament edition details

Dow Classic
Birmingham Classic (tennis)
1992 in English tennis
Dow Classic